Tuathal Ua Connachtaig (known in Latin as Thaddaeus)  was an Irish bishop in the 12th century.

He was present at the Synod of Kells in March 1152. He took the oath of fealty to Henry II in 1172 as Bishop of Kells, but is more often recorded  as Breifne.

References 

1288 deaths
12th-century Roman Catholic bishops in Ireland
Bishops of Kells
Bishops of Kilmore